Barry Marshall Richmond (14 November 1946 – 3 August 2002) was an American systems scientist, and former managing director of High Performance Systems, Inc (HPS), an organization providing software and consulting services to build the capacity of people to understand and improve the workings of dynamic systems. He is known as a leader in the field of systems thinking and system dynamics and for the development of the STELLA/iThink modelling environment for simulation.

Biography 
Richmond received a B.A. in psychology from Syracuse University, an MBA from Columbia University, an MA in operations research from Case Western Reserve University, and in 1979 a PhD in system dynamics from Massachusetts Institute of Technology, where he was a graduate student of Jay Wright Forrester. At the MIT Sloan School of Management Richmond became intrigued with the possibilities  of creating a software package to promote modeling and simulation activities using the new Macintosh computer produced by Apple.

Richmond taught courses in systems dynamics in the graduate school of engineering at Northeastern University, before becoming an assistant professor of systems dynamics and an Engineering Professor at Thayer School of Engineering, Dartmouth College. In 1984 he founded High Performance Systems, Inc (HPS), in 2004 renamed to ISEE Systems, and was CEO until his death in 2002. Richmond has also been an associate editor of the journal "Systems dynamics" and "Simulation".

In 2007, ISEE Systems established the "Barry Richmond Scholarship Award" to honor and continue the legacy of its founder. The award is presented annually to a deserving Systems Thinking/System Dynamics practitioner whose work demonstrates a desire to expand the field or to apply it to current social issues.

See also 
 Decision support system
 Vensim

Publications 
Richmond has published several books, papers and articles. A selection:
 1987. An Academic User's Guide to Stella Software. With Steve Peterson, Peter Vescuso and Nancy Maville. High Performance Systems.
 1987. The Simulation of an Arts Organization in STELLA TM. With Michael A Moldaver. Thayer School of Engineering.
 1987. The Strategic Forum: From Vision to Strategy to Operating Policies and Back Again. High Performance Systems, 1987.
 1992. An Introduction to Systems Thinking: Ithink Software. With Steve Peterson and Chris Charyk. High Performance Systems.
 2000. The "thinking" in systems thinking: Seven Essential Skills. Pegasus Communications.  
 2006. Guns at School: A Systems Thinking Perspective. ISEE Systems, 2006.

Articles, a selection:
 1993. "Systems thinking: critical thinking skills for the 1990s and beyond" in: System Dynamics Review Volume 9 Number 2 Summer 1993.
 1994. "System Dynamics/Systems Thinking: Let's Just Get On With It" Delivered at the 1994 International Systems Dynamics Conference, Sterling, Scotland.

References

Further reading 
 Diana M. Fisher and Lees Stuntz (2003). "Barry Richmond’s Gifts to K–12 Education". Paper System dynamics conference 2003.
 Jay W. Forrester (2001). "System Dynamics Self-Study: Readings". System Dynamics in Education Project, MIT OpenCourseWare.
 Steve Peterson (2003). "Barry Richmond, System Dynamics and Public Policy". Paper System dynamics conference 2003.

1946 births
2002 deaths
Engineers from New York (state)
Case Western Reserve University alumni
Dartmouth College faculty
MIT Sloan School of Management alumni
Northeastern University faculty
Syracuse University alumni
American operations researchers
20th-century American engineers